The Owensboro and Russellville Railroad was a 19th-century railway company in western Kentucky in the United States. It operated from 1867 to 1873, when it was purchased by the Evansville, Owensboro and Nashville Railroad. Its former rights-of-way currently form parts of the class-I CSX Transportation railway.

It connected with the Elizabethtown and Paducah (subsequently part of the Illinois Central and now the Paducah and Louisville Railway) at Central City in Muhlenberg County.

See also
 List of Kentucky railroads

Defunct Kentucky railroads
Defunct companies based in Kentucky